Artur Ashotovych Miranyan (born 27 December 1995) is a Ukrainian-born Armenian footballer who plays as a forward for Alashkert and the Armenia national team.

Career
Miranyan made his international debut for Armenia on 12 October 2019 in a UEFA Euro 2020 qualifying match against Liechtenstein, which finished as a 1–1 away draw.

On 28 February 2021, Urartu announced the signing of Miranyan. On 6 July 2022, Miranyan left Urartu.

On 5 February 2023, Alashkert announced the signing of Miranyan.

Career statistics

Club

International

References

External links
 
 
 
 

1995 births
Living people
Footballers from Donetsk
Armenian footballers
Ukrainian footballers
Ukrainian people of Armenian descent
Ukraine youth international footballers
Armenia under-21 international footballers
Armenia international footballers
Association football forwards
FC Shakhtar Donetsk players
FK Vardar players
FC Pyunik players
Macedonian First Football League players
Armenian Premier League players
Armenian expatriate footballers